King is a Canadian police drama which premiered April 17, 2011 on Showcase. The series stars Amy Price-Francis as  Jessica King, a veteran police officer who gets promoted to head of the Major Crimes Task Force in Toronto after her predecessor has a breakdown on television. Season 2 began production in September 2011 and premiered 29 February  2012.

On June 2, 2012, it was reported that King had been cancelled after two seasons.

Cast
 Amy Price-Francis as Detective Staff Sergeant Jessica King, the new head of the Major Crimes Task Force with eight years working Homicide, two failed marriages, and a desire to have an idyllic family life. Pilot Episode starts with King relegated to Communications section.
 Gabriel Hogan as Danny Sless, an officer with the 'Guns and Gangs' squad and Jessica's current husband
 Tony Nardi as Police Chief Peter Graci
 Suzanne Coy as Detective Eleni Demaris (season 1)
 Zoe Doyle as Detective MK Gordon (season 1)
 Aaron Poole as Detective Jason Collier (season 1)
 Alan van Sprang as Detective Sergeant Derek Spears, the former head of the Major Crimes Task Force and Jessica's partner
 Rossif Sutherland as Detective Pen Martin (season 2)
 Karen Robinson as Detective Ingrid Evans (season 2)

Production
King was created by and is executive produced by Bernard Zukerman and Greg Spottiswood and is produced by Indian Grove Productions in association with Shaw Media. The show is filmed in Toronto making use of a combination of on-location shooting and the soundstages of Dufferin Gate Productions. Filming of the first season began in November 2010 and was scheduled to conclude in February 2011. The first two episodes of the show were directed by Clark Johnson. In speaking of the casting Johnson said that they had seen many actresses before Amy Price-Francis auditioned and that prior to her audition he wasn't convinced she was right for the role but she "just became the character" and now "she completely embodies this character" much like what happened with Michael Chiklis on The Shield, another pilot that he directed. The first season has eight episodes. Filming of season 2 is scheduled for 29 September 2011 through 30 March 2012 with post-production completed by 17 April 2012.

Broadcast
The series premiered April 17, 2011 on Showcase in Canada, on May 19, 2011 it was announced that King will be shown on Séries+ for French-speaking Canadians. Shaw Media announced the renewal of the show on May 31, scheduling season two for a winter premiere on Showcase. The series was picked up by M6 for broadcast in France. The show premiered in Australia on TV1 in January 2012. The series has been picked up by the Universal Channel in the UK and premiered on April 5, 2012. The show premiered in The Netherlands on Net 5 on March 4, 2012. In Germany the series premiered on VOX on October 17, 2012 with 1.17 million viewers and a total in sharing of 2,58 million viewers, making it the highest rated TV-programming in this slot on date. It was announced on June 18, 2013, that the series will air on Reelz in the United States starting on July 5, 2013. The series began airing reruns on sister network Ovation on January 11, 2021. It is part of the network's strategy to incorporate an internationally diverse lineup with more Canadian and British co-productions upon the success of other British and Canadian productions such as Murdoch Mysteries for the 2020-21 American television season. The network also acquired one other series that was initially a co-produced of Reelz and CBC and one that had not hit the US that is from Global Television Network in Canada: Remedy and Cracked, respectively.

Episodes

Series overview

Season 1 (2011)

Season 2 (2012)

Home media
On 6 March 2012, Entertainment One released season 1 on DVD in Canada only. In 2013, Season 2 was released on DVD in the UK.

Reception
Bill Brioux notes that King is one of many new shows premiering in April 2011 which is making April to be the "new September", the traditional time for premiering new series in North America. "Spring really is the new fall on specialty channels." In reviewing the first episode Brioux found it "seemed pretty seen-it-before" but that Amy Price-Francis "has sass and sparkle which should enliven a drama with a bit of a dark comedy tone." Cassandra Szklarski points out that with the "recent explosion in Hogtown-based series" such as Flashpoint, Rookie Blue, and The Listener the unique spin of setting a cop drama in Toronto is no longer so unique. Szklarski admits that King is another "urban whodunit" but that it goes about it from a distinctively female point of view. Eric Volmers of the Calgary Herald found the fallibility of the character Derek Spears to be "what promises to give King its continued dramatic tension." Bill Harris of Quebecor Media found King is "not a cookie-cutter police procedural" in that DS King's personal life is a significant part of the show.

References

External links

 Official website
 
King on Facebook - official facebook page
 King on TV1 Australia

2011 Canadian television series debuts
2012 Canadian television series endings
Showcase (Canadian TV channel) original programming
Television shows filmed in Toronto
Television shows set in Toronto
2010s Canadian crime drama television series
Canadian police procedural television series
Television series by Corus Entertainment